The 2019 Pan American Aerobic Gymnastics Championships were held in Buenos Aires, Argentina, from October 10 to 13, 2019. The competition was approved by the International Gymnastics Federation.

Medalists

Senior

References

Pan American Aerobic Gymnastics Championships
International gymnastics competitions hosted by Argentina
Pan American Aerobic Gymnastics Championships
Pan American Aerobic Gymnastics Championships
Pan American Gymnastics Championships